Alan Omar Mendoza López (born 28 September 1993 in Tocumbo, Michoacán) is a Mexican professional footballer who plays as a defender.

Career

Youth
Mendoza joined Pumas's youth academy in 2009. He joined Pumas Youth Academy successfully going through U-17 and U-20. Until finally breaking thorough to the first team.

Pumas UNAM
Mendoza made his professional debut on Wednesday 25 July 2012, in the match against Atlético San Luis.

References

1993 births
Living people
Footballers from Michoacán
Mexican footballers
Association football defenders
Liga MX players
Club Universidad Nacional footballers
Club Necaxa footballers
Dorados de Sinaloa footballers
Club Celaya footballers
FC Juárez footballers